The 13th Fighter Squadron is a fighter squadron of the United States Air Force. The squadron flies the General Dynamics F-16 Fighting Falcon and is part of the 35th Fighter Wing at Misawa Air Base, Japan.

The squadron traces its heritage back to the 1942 activation of the 313th Bombardment Squadron. The squadron served in the continental United States as a training unit until its 1943 disbanding. The squadron was reactivated in 1966 as the 13th Tactical Fighter Squadron, fighting in the Vietnam War. The squadron flew Wild Weasel anti-SAM missions with the Republic F-105 Thunderchief and McDonnell Douglas F-4 Phantom II, operating out of Korat Royal Thai Air Force Base. The squadron moved to Udorn Royal Thai Air Force Base in October 1967, flying F-4s in combat air patrols against North Vietnamese MiGs and ground strike missions. The squadron was inactivated with the end of the war in 1975. The squadron was reactivated in 1976 a training squadron at MacDill Air Force Base, Florida, and inactivated again in 1982. The squadron was reactivated as the 13th Tactical Fighter Squadron in 1985 at Misawa, flying the F-16. It was redesignated the 13th Fighter Squadron in 1991.

Mission
The 13th Fighter Squadron "Panther Pack" operates the General Dynamics F-16 Fighting Falcon CM/DM Block 50 aircraft conducting air superiority missions. The Panthers provide in Offensive and Defensive Counter-Air capabilities, and specialize in the role of Suppression of Enemy Air Defenses.

History

World War II 
The squadron's first predecessor was constituted as the 313th Bombardment Squadron and activated on 1 February 1942 at Bowman Field, Kentucky, one of the original three squadrons of the 21st Bombardment Group.  It moved a week later to Jackson Army Air Base, Mississippi, where it began to organize with North American B-25 Mitchells.  The squadron moved to Columbia Army Air Base, South Carolina on 24 April.  At Columbia, the unit became a medium bomber Operational Training Unit (OTU).  The OTU program involved the use of an oversized parent unit to provide cadres to "satellite groups"  

On 26 May the 313th Squadron moved to Key Field, Mississippi.  The squadron interrupted its training mission on 8 June to fly an antisubmarine warfare mission.   It moved to MacDill Field, Florida on 26 June 1942.  At MacDill, the squadron converted to Martin B-26 Marauders.  It again flew antisubmarine missions between 31 July 1nd 8 August 1942.  The 313th continued its mission as an OTU at MacDill until it was disbanded on 10 October 1943.

Vietnam War

On 2 May 1966, the 13th Tactical Fighter Squadron was activated at Korat Royal Thai Air Force Base with the 388th Tactical Fighter Wing, flying the Republic F-105 Thunderchief and the McDonnell Douglas F-4D Phantom II. The squadron flew Wild Weasel missions to destroy North Vietnamese Surface-to-air missile sites. In October 1967, the squadron was moved to Udorn Royal Thai Air Force Base, becoming part of the 432d Tactical Reconnaissance Wing. At Udorn, the 13th flew F-4D and F-4E aircraft, remaining there for the remainder of the war. In 1971, the squadron adopted as a mascot a panther nicknamed "Eldridge" after a former member of the squadron, but later attributed to be named for Black Panther leader Eldridge Cleaver. The squadron later became known as the "Panther Pack". The squadron scored 11 MiG kills, compiled 21 aerial victories, and flew more than 30,000 combat sorties. The squadron earned 15 campaign streamers, six Air Force Outstanding Unit Awards with Valor, and the Republic of Vietnam Gallantry Cross with Palm during the war. The squadron was inactivated in June 1975 with the end of the war.

MacDill AFB Training unit 
The squadron was reactivated on 15 January 1976 at MacDill Air Force Base as the 13th Tactical Fighter Squadron, part of the 56th Tactical Fighter Wing. The squadron conducted F-4 pilot and weapon system officer replacement training and was inactivated on 1 July 1982.

Misawa Air Base 
On 1 June 1985, the 13th Tactical Fighter Squadron was reactivated at Misawa Air Base in Japan, assigned to the 432d Fighter Wing and flying the F-16A/B Fighting Falcon. The 13th became the first permanent fighter squadron stationed on mainland Japan since 1972. On 19 September, the 313th Bombardment Squadron's lineage was consolidated with the 13th TFS. On 31 May 1991, the 13th TFS was redesignated the 13th Fighter Squadron. It was transferred to the 35th Fighter Wing's 35th Operations Group on 1 October 1994, part of an organizational realignment to ensure wings with rich heritages remained active.

The squadron achieved initial operational capability in F-16CJs in 1996. The squadron's tail code was simultaneously changed from "MJ" to "WW" in recognition of the wing's Wild Weasel heritage. On 8 July of that year, the squadron became the first Pacific Air Forces F-16 unit to deploy in support of Operation Southern Watch, enforcing the no-fly zone over southern Iraq, as a result of a policy change allowing all units the opportunity to deploy. During Operation Southern Watch, the squadron flew its first combat missions since the 1975 Mayaguez incident. Since 1996, the 13th FS has deployed to Afghanistan, Iraq and Jordan ten times, most recently in 2014 to Jordan where the Panthers opened the US air campaign against the Islamic State. Eventually this effort would become known as Operation Inherent Resolve (OIR).

Lineage
 313th Bombardment Squadron
 Constituted as the  313th Bombardment Squadron (Medium) on 13 January 1942
 Activated on 1 February 1942
 Disbanded on 10 October 1943
 Reconstituted and consolidated with the 13th Tactical Fighter Squadron on 19 September 1985

 13th Fighter Squadron
 Constituted as the 13th Tactical Fighter Squadron and activated on 2 May 1966 (not organized)
 Organized on 15 May 1966
 Inactivated on 30 June 1975
 Redesignated 13th Tactical Fighter Training Squadron on 18 December 1975
 Activated on 15 January 1976
 Inactivated on 1 July 1982
 Redesignated 13th Tactical Fighter Squadron on 5 June 1984
 Activated on 1 June 1985
 Consolidated with the 313th Bombardment Squadron on 19 September 1985
 Redesignated as 13th Fighter Squadron on 31 May 1991

Assignments
 21st Bombardment Group, 1 February 1942 – 10 October 1943
 Pacific Air Forces, 2 May 1966 (not organized)
 18th Tactical Fighter Wing, 15 May 1966 (attached to 388th Tactical Fighter Wing until 17 October 1967)
 432d Tactical Reconnaissance Wing (later 432d Tactical Fighter Wing), 15 November 1967 – 30 June 1975
 56th Tactical Fighter Wing (later 56th Tactical Training Wing), 15 January 1976 – 1 July 1982
 432d Tactical Fighter Wing, 1 June 1985
 432d Operations Group, 31 May 1991
 35th Operations Group, 1 October 1994 – present

Stations
 Bowman Field, Kentucky, 1 February 1942
 Jackson Army Air Base, Mississippi, 8 February 1942
 Columbia Army Air Base, South Carolina, 21 April 1942
 Key Field, Mississippi, 24 May 1942
 Hattiesburg Army Air Field, Mississippi, 7 June 1942
 Key Field, Mississippi, 12 June 1942
 MacDill Field, Florida, 26 June 1942 – 10 October 1943
 Korat Royal Thai Air Force Base, Thailand, 15 May 1966
 Udorn Royal Thai Air Force Base, Thailand, 20 October 1967 – 30 June 1975
 MacDill Air Force Base, Florida, 15 January 1976 – 1 July 1982 (operated From: Tyndall Air Force Base, Florida, 26 November–22 December 1979)
 Misawa Air Base, Japan, 1 June 1985 – present

Aircraft
Douglas B-18 Bolo (1942)
Douglas A-20 Havoc (1942)
 North American B-25 Mitchell (1942)
 Martin B-26 Marauder (1942–1943)
Republic F-105 Thunderchief (1966–1967)
McDonnell Douglas F-4 Phantom II (1967–1982)
General Dynamics F-16 Fighting Falcon (1985–present)

Aces
Capt Jeffrey Feinstein. 5 kills

References

Notes
 Explanatory notes

 Notes

Bibliography

External links
 Eldridge the mascot
 Cambodia Bombing of the 13 TFS 1973 

013
1942 establishments in Kentucky